Arizona State University, Tempe 1980 is a live album by Bruce Springsteen and the E Street Band, released in December 2015 and was the ninth official release through the Bruce Springsteen Archives. The songs were performed on November 5, 1980, at the ASU Activity Center in Tempe, Arizona, during The River Tour. Unlike previous archive releases which contain full concerts, this ten-song collection includes only the songs that were missing from the live concert video release on Springsteen's 2015 box set The Ties That Bind: The River Collection.

Track listing
All songs by Bruce Springsteen

Set One
"Darkness on the Edge of Town" – 5:08
"Independence Day" – 7:03
"Factory" – 3:16
"Racing in the Street" – 8:30
"Candy's Room" – 3:29
"The Ties That Bind" – 3:27
"Stolen Car" – 4:50
"Wreck on the Highway" – 4:56
"Point Blank" – 7:57
"Backstreets" – 8:29

Personnel 
 Bruce Springsteen – lead vocals, guitars, harmonica
 Roy Bittan – piano, background vocals
 Clarence Clemons – saxophone, percussion, background vocals
 Danny Federici – organ, electronic glockenspiel, background vocals
 Garry Tallent – bass guitar
 Steven Van Zandt – guitars, background vocals
 Max Weinberg – drums

References

2015 live albums
Bruce Springsteen Archives